Padmāvatī may refer to:

Deities
 Lakshmi, Hindu goddess of fortune.
 Alamelu, or Padmāvatī, a Hindu goddess and consort of Sri Venkateshwara of Tirupati
 Manasa, a Hindu serpent goddess 
 Padmavati (Jainism), a Jain attendant goddess (Yakshini)
 Padmavati-King Vashuha and Queen Shubra's daughter of Pulinda; Satyavarma's younger sister; Karna's wife and Vrishasena, Vrishaketu, Chitrasena, Satyasena, Sushena, Shatrunjaya, Dvipata, Banasena, Prasena and Sudama.
 Padmavati (North Indian tradition)-Ashoka's third wife and Kunala's mother.

Arts and media
 Padmavat, a 1540 epic ballad written in the Awadhi dialect of Hindi
 Padmavati (poem), a 1648 epic ballad written in the Bengali language
 Padmaavat, formerly titled Padmavati, a 2018 Indian film
 Padmâvatî (opera), by French composer Albert Roussel
 Padmāvatī, in Bhasa's Svapnavasavadattam

People
 Rani Padmavati, chief concubine of Emperor Ashoka
 Rani Padmini, also known as Padmavati, a legendary queen of Chittor and wife of the ruler Ratan Singh, celebrated in the Padmavat
 S. I. Padmavati (born 1917), Indian cardiologist and recipient of the Padma Vibhushan
 Padmavati, consort of Ugrasena and mother of Kamsa
 Padmavati, a regional wife of Karna

Other uses
 Padmavati Pawaya, an ancient city mentioned in Sanskrit classics and inscriptions
 Sri Padmavati Mahila Visvavidyalayam, a university in Tirupati named after the Hindu goddess

See also
 Nagas of Padmavati, a dynasty which ruled in ancient Padmavati
 Padmavathi, a Hindu  (goddess)

Indian feminine given names